Hilary Jane Williams, Baroness Williams of Oystermouth (née Paul; born 1957), is an English Anglican theologian and writer. 

Williams was born on 4 March 1957 in Trivandrum, India, one of five sisters. Her father, Geoffrey Paul, former Bishop of Bradford, was then serving as a missionary priest at Palayamkottai and later Kerala. Her father was a member of the faculty and later became the principal of the Kerala United Theological Seminary at Kannammoola, where she spent part of her childhood. She studied theology at Clare College, Cambridge, and then worked in theological publishing and education. For three years she  wrote a Sunday readings column for the Church Times (published by SPCK as Lectionary Reflections) and now works part-time for Redemptorist Publications, as a visiting lecturer at King's College London. She is assistant dean and lecturer at St Mellitus College (formerly St Paul's Theological Centre) in London.

Williams has been married since July 1981 to Rowan Williams, who was appointed as the 104th Archbishop of Canterbury in 2002. They have a daughter named Rhiannon (born 1988) and a son named Pip (born 1996). Following her husband's retirement as Archbishop of Canterbury and his subsequent peerage, Williams is entitled to the style and title of Lady Williams of Oystermouth.

Bibliography
 Bread, Wine and Women: the ordination debate in the Church of England (with Sue Dowell), Virago, London, 1994. 
 Perfect Freedom (Borders), Canterbury Press, Norwich, 2001. 
 Lectionary Reflections: Year C, SPCK, London, 2003. 
 Lectionary Reflections: Year A, SPCK, London, 2004. 
 Lectionary Reflections: Year B, SPCK, London, 2005. 
 Approaching Christmas, Lion, Oxford, 2005. 
 Angels, Lion, Oxford, 2006. 
 Who Do You Say That I Am? Exploring Images of Jesus (Church Times Study Guides), Canterbury Press, Norwich, 2006. 
 The Fellowship of the Three: Exploring the Trinity (Church Times Study Guides), Canterbury Press, Norwich, 2006. 
 The Mighty Tortoise: Exploring the Church (Church Times Study Guides), Canterbury Press, Norwich, 2006. 
 Moving Mountains (Church Times Study Guides), Canterbury Press, Norwich, 2007. 
 Approaching Easter, Lion, Oxford, 2006. 
 A Christian Funeral: A Guide for the Family, Redemptorist Publications, Chawton, 2006. 
 Marriage, Mitres and Being Myself, SPCK, London, 2008. 
 Lost for Words? A Sermon Resource for the Anglican Three-Year Cycle, Redemptorist Publications, Chawton, 2009. 
 Lectionary Reflections: Years A, B & C, SPCK, London, 2011. 
 Faces of Christ: Jesus in Art, Lion, Oxford, 2011. 
 "Why Did Jesus Have to Die?"

References

1957 births
21st-century Anglican theologians
Women Christian theologians
21st-century English theologians
Academics of King's College London
Alumni of Clare College, Cambridge
Williams of Oystermouth
English Anglican theologians
Living people
Spouses of life peers
Writers from Thiruvananthapuram
Staff of St Mellitus College